Face control refers to the policy of upscale nightclubs, casinos, restaurants and similar establishments to strictly restrict entry based on a bouncer's snap judgment of the suitability of a person's looks, money, style or attitude, especially in Greece, Russia and other former Soviet countries such as Ukraine. The term "face control" comes from the fact that establishments are attempting to use exclusivity to preserve their public "face".

Although a similar "velvet rope" policy exists in other countries, aiming to admit the right mix of "beautiful people" and keep out boring or unattractive would-be patrons, the Russian version is considered particularly harsh and unforgiving by Western standards.

The rare occasional use of this term in English can be considered a linguistic reborrowing via the Russian pseudo-anglicism фейсконтроль (feiskontrol).

Admission standards
Some establishments only practice face control on Fridays and Saturdays, so customers unable to meet the bouncer's standards can come at other times. In Moscow, stricter face control tends to be implemented as the evening progresses, so people can also avoid it by coming early for dinner, before the bouncers are posted. As foreigners are sometimes preferred, speaking English has also been noted as helpful in getting through face control. Author of Loney Planet Russia, Simon Richmond advises to "arrive in a small group, preferably with more men than women" and to smile to "show the bouncer that you are going to enhance the atmosphere inside".

See also
Dress code

References

External links
 Clubbing and face control in Moscow
 

Nightlife